"I Don't" is a song by American singer Mariah Carey featuring American rapper YG. Carey previewed the track during an episode of her E! docuseries, Mariah's World, on January 29, 2017. Epic Records released it as a single five days later on February 3. The song samples the Donell Jones song "Where I Wanna Be".

Production and release

Carey debuted "I Don't" during an episode of her E! docuseries, Mariah's World, on January 29, 2017. Footage of Carey recording a snippet of the song in a studio booth was broadcast during the episode, which Hugh McIntyre of Forbes described as "perfect timing as far as promotion goes". Two days later on January 31, the cover art was revealed by Carey via her official Twitter; it shows the singer in the backseat of a white car with red leathers and accompanied by the track's featured rapper, YG, riding shotgun. Epic Records subsequently released the track for download on February 3, 2017. On March 24, 2017, a remix featuring Remy Ma was released.

Critical reception
Mike Wiss of Idolator described the song as being as "legendary" as the artwork: "Mariah Carey has had a really tough year. She literally rang in 2017 with one of the worst (not-quite) live performances of all time and endured the various humiliations of Mariah's World. He added: "Happily, everything else is spot on. Mariah's voice is in fine form and the decision to interpolate Donnell Jones' "Where I Wanna Be" is inspired." Hugh McIntyre from Forbes wrote that the song "doesn’t see the pop star stepping too far out of the comfort zone she’s created over the past decade, opting for a laid back vibe that may please her true devotees, but which might not be uptempo enough to catch the attention of fairweather fans".

Music video
The music video for the song premiered via Carey's Vevo channel on February 3, 2017. It depicts Carey forlorn by her breakup, wearing a wedding dress only to eventually burn it. She moves in and out of a car in various outfits, from latex to lace. At one point, Carey wears an engagement ring on her middle finger, before pointing it at the camera. Carey directed the video herself and executive-produced the video with her former manager, Stella Bulochnikov.

Live performances
Carey and YG performed "I Don't" live on Jimmy Kimmel Live! on February 15, 2017. A few days later, she performed the song live at Dubai Jazz Festival.

Track listing

Charts

Release history

References

2017 singles
2017 songs
Mariah Carey songs
YG (rapper) songs
Remy Ma songs
Songs written by Mariah Carey
Songs written by Kyle West
Songs written by YG (rapper)
Songs written by Donell Jones
Songs written by Johntá Austin
Songs written by Remy Ma
Epic Records singles
Trap music songs